Damien Tiernan (born 1970) is an Irish journalist. He was the South East Correspondent for RTÉ News from 1996 to 2019. He quit his post with RTÉ in January 2019 to work with Waterford Local Radio.

Prior to working for RTÉ he worked as a reporter for the Wicklow People and New Ross Standard. Damien was educated at Presentation College, in Bray, and University College Dublin studying English and Philosophy.

References

1970 births
Living people
Irish radio presenters
Irish journalists
RTÉ newsreaders and journalists